6-MAPB (1-(benzofuran-6-yl)-N-methylpropan-2-amine) is a psychedelic and entactogenic drug which is structurally related to 6-APB and MDMA. It is not known to have been widely sold as a "designer drug" but has been detected in analytical samples taken from individuals hospitalised after using drug combinations that included other benzofuran derivatives. 6-MAPB was banned in the UK in June 2013, along with 9 other related compounds which were thought to produce similar effects.

References

Methamphetamines
6-Benzofuranethanamines
Designer drugs
Entactogens and empathogens